In botany, an awn is either a hair- or bristle-like appendage on a larger structure, or in the case of the Asteraceae, a stiff needle-like element of the pappus.

Awns are characteristic of various plant families, including Geraniaceae and many grasses (Poaceae).

Description
In grasses, awns typically extend from the lemmas of the florets. This often makes the hairy appearance of the grass synflorescence. Awns may be long (several centimeters) or short, straight or curved, single or multiple per floret. Some biological genera are named after their awns, such as the three-awns (Aristida).

In some species, the awns can contribute significantly to photosynthesis, as, for example, in barley.

The awns of wild emmer-wheat spikelets effectively self-cultivate by propelling themselves mechanically into soils.  During a period of increased humidity during the night, the awns of the spikelet become erect and draw together, and in the process push the grain into the soil.  During the daytime the humidity drops and the awns slacken back again; however, fine silica hairs on the awns act as ratchet hooks in the soil and prevent the spikelets from reversing back out again.  During the course of alternating stages of daytime and nighttime humidity, the awns' pumping movements, which resemble swimming frog kick, drill the spikelet as much as an inch into the soil.

When awns occur in the Geraniaceae, they form the distal (rostral) points of the five  carpels, lying parallel in the  style above the ovary. Depending on the species, such awns have various  seed-dispersal functions, either dispersing the seed by flinging it out (seed ejection); flinging away the entire carpel so that it snaps off (carpel projection); entangling the awn or bristles on passing animals (zoochory); or possibly burying the seed by twisting as it lies on soft soil.

References

External links 

Plant morphology